KSCN may refer to:

 KSCN (FM), a radio station (96.9 FM) licensed to Pittsburg, Texas, United States
 Potassium thiocyanate, a chemical compound with the molecular formula KSCN